Clary Ranch, formerly a private cattle ranch, is a site of multiple archaeological digs, many of which produced significant artifacts and remains.

Clary Ranch History

Clary Ranch was first reported to the University of Nebraska State Museum (UNSM) in 1970. Rancher Oren V. Clary had noticed artifacts, charcoal, and bison remains eroding from the base of a cut bank in Ash Hollow Draw. In 1979, archaeologist Thomas Myers began the first of four consecutive month-long summer field seasons from 1979 to 1983. Myers was assisted by vertebrate paleontologists R. George Corner and Lloyd G. Tanner.  Though much was found, the site was never fully reported on until Matthew G Hill started a comprehensive analysis of the bison remains in 1997. Hill's report was completed several years later and used in his doctoral dissertation from the University of Wisconsin–Madison. From Hill's assessment new questions of the site arose, so a series of field seasons were held between 2001 and 2004.

1979-1982 Excavations
The first excavations of Clary Ranch were led by Myers, Corner, and Tanner, and the crews consisted of volunteer members of the Nebraska Archaeological Society. The excavations averaged 50 1x1 meter units excavated each summer. In the end of the '82 season, a total of approximately 194 m2 had been excavated over two different areas: Area A had 182 m2 excavated, while Area B, which was located 8 m west of the main block, had 12 m2 excavated. It was standard protocol for the excavators to only identify map larger faunal remains, articulated remains, and formal artifacts. Though smaller elements were not mapped, they were collected by unit and level. This meant that minimally each recovered item has a 1 by 1 m excavation unit provenience.

From these field seasons, the UNSM collected a bison assemblage of 1966 (NISP) specimen. From these elements, the minimum number of individuals at the site is 41. Though many specimen have been identified, most of the bones are fragmentary with only 15 long bones that were unbroken. This information, coupled with the 247 unidentified long bone shaft fragments, highly suggests that the assemblage was processed for marrow. Based on volumetric data from modern bison, it is estimated that 4.5 gallons of marrow were acquired.  This is because almost all long bones (90%) were processed for marrow, no matter how much nutrition they provide.

2001-2004 Excavations
Upon completion of his 1997 faunal analysis, Matt Hill was left with several questions that were currently unanswerable given the data sets. In order to attempt to answer remaining questions, two field sessions totaling 15 days were held using "reconnaissance-type investigations " to re-expose past excavations, identify areas of intact sediment, and assess the potential for renewed excavations. The site returned positive results for excavations, so in 2003 an Iowa State University field school was held. The main goal of this field school was to review the recovery methods employed by the UNSM, specifically, if the excavations methods shaped the lithic collections, which was void of microdebitage. The 2003 excavations were located in between 10 previous units, all of which had produced  bison remains, but no lithic material. The area was separated into 1x1 m2 units, which were then separated into 16 25x25 cm2 sections and excavated at arbitrary levels of 2 cm2. One of the most important results of the 2003 excavations was the extraction of collagen from a bison femur shaft fragment that provided the first radiocarbon date for the site, which was 9040 35 years before present.

Secondly, no chipped stone artifacts were recovered in situ. Thirty-three pieces of microdebitage were recovered using water screening techniques, the largest of which measured 7 millimeters. From this information it was figured that the UNSM excavations were unbiased towards small artifacts. Second, this contrasted UNSM data of areas featuring heavy artifact and debitage clusters, which helps argue for specified use of areas in the site. Using this information, Hill sought to answer even more questions, and in 2004 he returned for another field school with funding from the National Science Foundation.

References

General references

Hill, M.G.. et al., Faunal exploitation by Early Holocene hunter/gatherers on the Great Plains of North America: Evidence from the Clary Ranch sites. Quaternary International (2007)
 Hill, Matthew G., 2008 Paleoindian Subsistence Dynamics on the Northwestern Great Plains: Zooarchaeology of the Clary Ranch and Agate Basin Sites BAR International Series, 1756 Oxford
 Holven, Adam C., A GIS Analysis of Paleoindian site structure at the Clary Ranch site Unpublished masters thesis, Iowa State University, 2006
 Raynolds, R. G., editor, Roaming the Rocky Mountains and Environs: Geological Field Trips Geological Society of America: Field Guide 10 Geological Society of America, Boulder
 Hill, Matthew G., Late Paleoindian (Allen/Frederick Complex) Subsistence Activities at the Clary Ranch Site, Ash Hollow, Garden County, Nebraska Plains Anthropologist, Vol 50, No 195, pgs 249–263, 2005
 Hill, Matthew G., et al., 2001 Investigations at the Clary Ranch Site, Nebraska CRP 19, pgs 32–34, 2002
 Hill, Matthew G., et al., A New Stratified Late-Paleoindian Locality on the Clary Ranch, Ash Hollow, Garden County, Nebraska CRP 23, pgs 110–112, 2006

Archaeological sites in Nebraska
Geography of Garden County, Nebraska
Pre-statehood history of Nebraska